Villca is a surname, and may refer to;

Andrés Villca – Bolivian politician
Lino Villca Delgado – Bolivian politician
Óscar Soliz Villca – Bolivian professional road cyclist
Fredy Trocones Villcas – Mayor of Pacobamba District
Juan Mamani Villca – Mayor of Comanche Municipality
Doroteo Villca – Bolivian pianist

Quechuan-language surnames